45 Days is a documentary film about Christian metalcore band Demon Hunter. The three-disc set, two DVDs and one CD, was released on November 25, 2008. The DVDs of the release consist of a 90-minute documentary on the band, including touring and in depth interviews on the first disc, and an entire live concert on the second disc. The live set was recorded at Rockettown in Nashville, TN on June 26, 2008 during the band's "Stronger Than Hell" tour alongside Living Sacrifice. The included CD will be the music that serves as a soundtrack to the documentary.

Track listing

Credits
 Don Clark – rhythm guitar, producer
 Ryan Clark – vocals, producer
 Jon Dunn – bass guitar
 Ethan Luck – guitar
 Timothy "Yogi" Watts – drums
 Patrick Judge – live guitar 
 Cale Glendening – director, photographer, editor
 Jeff Carver – assistant producer
 Ryan Downey – assistant producer
 Brandon Ebel – executive producer

Awards
The album was nominated for a Dove Award for Long Form Music Video of the Year at the 41st GMA Dove Awards.

References

Demon Hunter albums
2008 live albums
Live video albums
Documentary films about heavy metal music and musicians
Tooth & Nail Records live albums
Tooth & Nail Records video albums